Murray G. H. Pittock MAE FRSE (born 5 January 1962) is a Scottish historian, Bradley Professor of Literature at the University of Glasgow and Pro Vice Principal at the University, where he has served in senior roles including Dean and Vice Principal since 2008. He led for the University on the University/City of Glasgow/National Library of Scotland Kelvin Hall development (kelvinhall.org.uk), the first phase of which was opened by the First Minister of Scotland, Nicola Sturgeon, and has also chaired other major projects on learning and teaching space and Glasgow's unique early career development programme. He has also acted as lead or co-lead for a range of national and International partnerships, including with the Smithsonian Institution, and plays a leading role in the University's engagement with government and the cultural and creative industries (CCIs), organizing the 'Glasgow and Dublin: Creative Cities' summit in the British Embassy in Dublin in 2019, and working with the European network CIVIS on civic engagement. He also produced a major report on the impact of Robert Burns on the Scottish Economy for the Scottish Government in 2020; a Parliamentary debate was held at Holyrood on the recommendations. In 2022, he was declared Scotland's Knowledge Exchange Champion of the year. Outside the University, he serves on the Research Excellence Framework (REF) Institutional Environment Pilot Panel, and the National Trust for Scotland Board and Investment Committee, as well as acting as Co-chair of the Scottish Arts and Humanities Alliance (SAHA). He also serves as Scottish History Adviser to the NTS and as an adviser to a wide range of other national heritage bodies and the Scottish Parliament. He is on the Advisory Board of NISE, the Europe-wide platform for research on national identities and is President of the Edinburgh Walter Scott Club in 2019-20 and 2021-22.

Previously he was Professor of Scottish and Romantic Literature and Deputy Head of Arts at the University of Manchester, becoming the first ever professor of Scottish Literature at an English university. He has also held visiting appointments at universities worldwide in Celtic Studies, English, History, Languages and Equality and Diversity including: New York University (2015), Notre Dame (2014), Charles University, Prague (2010); Trinity College, Dublin (2008); Auburn (2006) the University of Wales in advanced Welsh and Celtic studies (2002) and Yale (1998, 2000–01). He has been invited as a visitor or to speak at leading universities including Berkeley, Columbia, Harvard, Stanford and the Sorbonne.

Biography
Murray Pittock was born to Malcolm Pittock and Joan MacCormack. He grew up in Aberdeen, attended Aberdeen Grammar School, and studied at University of Glasgow aged 16.

Education and academia
Pittock received an M.A. from the University of Glasgow, then won the Snell Exhibition to study at Balliol College, Oxford where he completed his D.Phil. At Balliol he was Oxford University Debating Champion (with Boris Johnson) and a member of the British Isles Debating Team/ESU-USA Tour. He ran the Express Newspapers Scottish national debating competition in 1982–83 and has had a long media career with over 1600 appearances in some 50 countries.

Pittock was appointed as a lecturer and then, reader, at the University of Edinburgh in 1989 and 1994, where he also had Faculty and University roles, including the corporate policy lead for the University's Scotland-related policies. He moved to Glasgow in 1996 to take up a chair in Literature at the University of Strathclyde, also serving as Head of Department, a member of the Governing Body and theme lead for Arts, Culture and Sport policy. In 2003 Pittock moved to the University of Manchester as Professor of Scottish and Romantic Literature and worked on the changes needed for the merger with UMIST in Arts. He moved to Glasgow in 2007.

Academic work
Pittock's books deal with a variety of subjects including English, History, Art History, Politics and VR/XR. His research includes groundbreaking books on the Jacobite literature and the Jacobite armies, and on the nature of national culture, the construction of Celtic identities and the existence and nature of a distinctive Scottish Romanticism. His work has appeared in Braille, French, Hebrew, Mandarin and Spanish as well as in English.  His study of Culloden was selected by Jeremy Black as his choice for one of the ten "best history books of the year" by History Today  and was recommended by Conservative MP Keith Simpson for reading by all non-Scottish MPs.  In 2018, Pittock published the first ever scholarly edition of Robert Burns and James Johnson's Scots Musical Museum in two volumes and a book which challenges the conventional dates for the Enlightenment and uses Smart City theory to explore the early modern city. In 2022, he published Scotland: The Global History with Yale University Press, and continues to act as General Editor of the Edinburgh Edition of Allan Ramsay, which received a major Arts and Humanities Research Council grant for 2018-23. In 2013,  he planned and secured agreement for the development of a national graduate school of arts and humanities in Scotland. In 2014, he founded the first International Association for the Study of Scottish Literatures, which has held or is planning a sequence of international Congresses, at Glasgow (2014), Vancouver (2017), Prague (2022), Nottingham (2024) and Columbia SC (2026).

Pittock gave evidence in November 2021, on behalf of SAHA to the Scottish Parliament (Holyrood) Europe Committee on Scotland's international strategy, that the country's image is two centuries old, one of 'castles, mountains, heather and whisky'  and less external awareness exists of a modern 'cutting edge' brand image, with a focus on the country's scientific innovation including developments on 'climate change, digital, cultural, progressive and humanitarian legislation.'

Honours
Pittock is a fellow of the Royal Society of Edinburgh and a Member of Academia Europaea and has been awarded or shortlisted for numerous prizes. He is one of few academics to have given a prize lecture at both the Royal Society of Edinburgh and the British Academy, where he gave the Chatterton lecture in poetry in 2002. In 2011–13, he convened the National Champions' Group, supporting the introduction and development of Scottish Studies in schools. Pittock has appeared in the media in over 50 countries and has been described as "Scotland's leading public intellectual",by Christopher Goulding as "probably Scotland's leading cultural commentator" and by the Joan McAlpine as "Scotland's leading cultural historian".

Publications
 Scotland: The Global History: 1603 to the Present (2022)
 Enlightenment in a Smart City: Edinburgh's Civic Development, 1660–1750 (2018,reprinted 2019, 2022)
 The Scots Musical Museum (2 vols: 2018)
 Culloden (2016, reprinted 2017, 2022; Folio Society, 2021)
 The Reception of Robert Burns in Europe (ed, 2014)
 The Road to Independence? Scotland in the Balance (2014)
 Material Culture and Sedition (2013)
 The Edinburgh Companion to Scottish Romanticism (ed, 2011) 
 Robert Burns in Global Culture (ed, 2011) 
 Loyalty and Identity (co-ed, 2010)
 The Myth of the Jacobite Clans: The Jacobite Army in 1745 (2009) 
 Scottish and Irish Romanticism (2008, corrected ed, 2011) 
 The Road to Independence? Scotland Since the Sixties (2008)
 James Boswell (2007)
 The Reception of Sir Walter Scott in Europe (ed, 2007; corrected ed, 2014)
 The Edinburgh History of Scottish Literature (co-ed, 2006)
 A New History of Scotland (2003)
 James Hogg: The Jacobite Relics of Scotland, 2 volumes, (2002–03)
 Scottish Nationality (2001)
 Celtic Identity and the British Image (1999)
 Jacobitism (1998)
 Inventing and Resisting Britain (1997)
 The Myth of the Jacobite Clans (1995)
 Poetry and Jacobite Politics in Eighteenth-Century Britain and Ireland (1994; paperback, 2006)
 Spectrum of Decadence: The Literature of the 1890s (1993, reissued 2014, paperback 2016)
 Clio's Clavers (1992)
 The Invention of Scotland (1991, reissued 2014, paperback 2016)

References

External links 
 Centre for Robert Burns Studies
 Full text of doctoral thesis, "Decadence and the English tradition" via Oxford Research Archive

Living people
20th-century Scottish historians
1962 births
21st-century Scottish historians
Academics of the University of Glasgow